Steven Levitan Productions (also known as Levitan Productions) is an American television production company founded by television producer and writer Steven Levitan. It is known for producing the long-running series Modern Family.

In July 2006, Levitan co-partnered with Christopher Lloyd to set up Lloyd-Levitan Productions at 20th Century Fox.

In March 2014, the company entered a four-year overall deal with 20th Century Fox Television.

In September 2019, the company entered a five-year overall deal with 20th Television.

Filmography

In production
 Untitled Erin Foster project (with 3 Arts Entertainment and 20th Television)

Former
 Reboot (with 20th Television) (2022)
 LA to Vegas (with Briskets Big Yellow House, Gary Sanchez Productions and 20th Century Fox Television) (2018)
 Modern Family (with Picador Productions and 20th Century Fox Television) (2009–2020)
 Stacked (with 20th Century Fox Television) (2005–2006)
 Oliver Beene (with (ge.wirtz) Films, DreamWorks Television and 20th Century Fox Television (2003–2004)
 Greg the Bunny (with 20th Century Fox Television) (2002)
 Stark Raving Mad (with 20th Century Fox Television) (1999–2000)
 Just Shoot Me! (with Brillstein-Grey Communications and Columbia Pictures Television) (1997–2003)

References

Mass media companies established in 1994
Television production companies of the United States